Pemtumomab (trade name Theragyn) is a mouse monoclonal antibody used to treat cancer. The substance has affinity to various types of cancer, like ovarian cancer and peritoneal cancer, via the polymorphic epithelial mucin (PEM or MUC-1) and delivers the radioisotope Yttrium-90 into the tumour. , it is undergoing Phase III clinical trials.

It has been granted orphan drug status in Europe.

References 

Monoclonal antibodies for tumors
Orphan drugs
Experimental drugs